Vinayagapuram is a Tamil village in the Thirukkovil Divisional Secretariat Division of the Ampara District in the Eastern Province of Sri Lanka.  In the early days, all the land that was once a coastal land was ceded to the state and distributed to the landless in 1959.  The village was named Vinayagapuram in 1962 as a settlement village.

Schools
Parameshwara Vidyalayam
Shakthy Vidyalayam

References

Villages in Ampara District
Thirukkovil DS Division